Mexico competed at the 1992 Summer Olympics in Barcelona, Spain. The country sent 102 athletes (76 men and 26 women) and competed in 71 events in 18 sports.

Medalists

Competitors
The following is the list of number of competitors in the Games.

Archery

In its fourth Olympic archery competition, Mexico entered three men and one woman.  Only one of the individuals advanced to the elimination rounds, where he was defeated in the first match.  The men's team missed the team round by one ranking.  They were 4 points behind the 16th place team.

Women's Individual Competition:
 Aurora Breton — Ranking round, 45th place (0-0)

Men's Individual Competition:
 José Anchondo — Round of 32, 31st place (0-1)
 Ricardo Rojas — Ranking round, 37th place (0-0)
 Omar Bustani — Ranking round, 67th place (0-0)

Men's Team Competition:
 Anchondo, Rojas, and Bustani — Ranking round, 17th place (0-0)

Athletics

Men's 5,000 metres
 Ignacio Fragoso — 14.16,14 (→ 42nd place)

Men's 10,000 metres
Arturo Barrios
 Heat — 28:28.26
 Final — 28:17.79 (→ 5th place)

Germán Silva
 Heat — 28:13.72
 Final — 28:20.19 (→ 6th place)

Armando Quintanilla
 Heat — 28:23.76
 Final — 28:48.05(→ 16th place)

Men's Marathon
 Isidro Rico — 2:18.52 (→ 29th place)
 Dionicio Cerón — did not finish (→ no ranking)

Men's 4 × 100 m Relay
 Genaro Rojas, Eduardo Nava, Raymundo Escalante, Herman Adam and Alejandro Cárdenas

Men's 4 × 400 m Relay
Raymundo Escalante, Eduardo Nava, Luis Karin Toledo, and  Juan Vallin Gutierrez
 Heat — 3:05.75 (→ did not advance)

Men's 20 km Walk
Daniel Garcia — 1:25:35 (→ 7th place)
Joel Sánchez — 1:30:12 (→ 21st place)
Ernesto Canto — 1:33:51 (→ 29th place)

Men's 50 km Walk
Carlos Mercenario — 3:52:09 (→  Silver Medal)
Miguel Rodríguez — 3:58:26 (→ 8th place)
Germán Sánchez — DSQ (→ no ranking)

Women's 10,000 metres
María Luisa Servín
 Heat — 33:42.74 (→ did not advance)

Women's Marathon
 Olga Appell — did not finish (→ no ranking)

Women's 10 km Walk
Maricela Chávez
 Final — 48:39 (→ 28th place)

Eva Machuca
 Final — 50:02 (→ 30th place)

Graciela Mendoza
 Final — DSQ (→ no ranking)

Women's High Jump
 Cristina Fink
 Qualification — 1.83 m (→ did not advance)

Boxing

Men's Flyweight (— 51 kg)
Narciso González
First Round — Lost to Benjamin Mwangata (TAN), RSCH-3 (01:43)

Men's Bantamweight (— 54 kg)
Javier Calderón
First Round — Defeated Benjamin Ngaruiya (KEN), 16:4
Second Round — Lost to Remigio Molina (ARG), 4:5

Men's Light-Welterweight (– 63.5 kg)
Edgar Ruiz
First Round — Lost to Leonard Doroftei (ROM), 4:24
 
Men's Light-Heavyweight (– 81 kg)
Manuel Verde
First Round — Lost to Patrice Aouissi (FRA), RSCH-3 (01:46)

Canoeing

Cycling

Five male cyclists represented Mexico in 1992.

Men's 1 km time trial
 César Muciño

Men's team pursuit
 Arturo García
 César Muciño
 Jesús Vázquez
 Marco Zaragoza

Men's points race
 Manuel Youshimatz

Diving

Men's 3m Springboard
Jorge Mondragón
 Preliminary Round — 384.45 points
 Final — 604.14 points (→ 6th place)

Fernando Platas
 Preliminary Round — 355.47 points (→ did not advance, 17th place)

Men's 10m Platform
Alberto Acosta
 Preliminary Round — 398.55 points
Final — 482.28 points (→ 11th place)

Jesús Mena
 Preliminary Round — 370.47 (→ did not advance, 15th place)

Women's 3m Springboard
 María Elena Romero
 Preliminary Round — 269.34 (→ did not advance, 16th place)

 Ana Ayala
 Preliminary Round — 249.03 (→ did not advance, 25th place)

Women's 10m Platform
María Alcalá
Final — 394.35 points (→ 6th place)

Macarena Alexanderson
Preliminary Round — 286.59 points (→ 13th place)

Equestrianism

Football

Men's team competition
Preliminary round (group D)
 Drew with Denmark (1-1)
 Drew with Australia (1-1)
 Drew with Ghana (1-1) → did not advance

Team roster 
( 1.) José Alberto Guadarrama
( 2.) Ricardo Cadena
( 3.) Manuel Vidrio
( 4.) Alberto Macías
( 5.) Silviano Delgado
( 6.) Joaquín Hernández
( 7.) José Agustín Morales
( 8.) David Rangel
( 9.) Francisco Rotllán
(10.) Jorge Castañeda
(11.) Damián Álvarez
(12.) Miguel Fuentes
(13.) Camilo Romero
(14.) Carlos López
(15.) José Eduardo Pavez
(16.) Mario Arteaga
(17.) Pedro Pineda
(18.) Ángel Lemus
(19.) Ignacio Vázquez
(20.) Ángel Maldonado
Head coach: Óscar Iparraguirre

Gymnastics

Judo

Modern pentathlon

Three male pentathletes represented Mexico in 1992.

Individual
 Iván Ortega
 Alejandro Yrizar
 Alberto Félix

Team
 Iván Ortega
 Alejandro Yrizar
 Alberto Félix

Rowing

Sailing

Women's 470 Class
Margarita Pazos and Karla Gutiérrez
 Final Ranking — 126 points (→ 17th place)

Shooting

Swimming

Men's 50m Freestyle
 Rodrigo González
 Heat — 23.52 (→ did not advance, 27th place)

Men's 100m Freestyle
 Rodrigo González
 Heat — 51.04 (→ did not advance, 22nd place)

Men's 100m Breaststroke
 Javier Careaga
 Heat — 1:03.45 (→ did not advance, 20th place)

Men's 200m Breaststroke
 Javier Careaga
 Heat — 2:15.59
 B-Final — 2:16.55 (→ did not advance, 15th place)

Women's 400m Freestyle
 Laura Sánchez
 Heat — 4:23.87 (→ did not advance, 23rd place)

 Erika González
 Heat — 4:32.06 (→ did not advance, 29th place)

Women's 800m Freestyle
 Laura Sánchez
 Heat — 9:10.31 (→ did not advance, 21st place)

 Erika González
 Heat — 9:17.18 (→ did not advance, 25th place)

Women's 100m Butterfly
 Gabriela Gaja
 Heat — 1:04.84 (→ did not advance, 40th place)

Women's 4 × 100 m Medley Relay
 Heike Koerner, Ana Mendoza, Gabriela Gaja, and Laura Sánchez
 Heat — 4:26.73 (→ did not advance, 17th place)

Synchronized Swimming

Three synchronized swimmers represented Mexico in 1992.

Women's solo
Sonia Cárdeñas
Elizabeth Cervantes
Lourdes Olivera

Women's duet
Sonia Cárdeñas
Lourdes Olivera

Tennis

Men's Singles Competition
 Francisco Maciel
 First round — Lost to Jakob Hlasek (Switzerland) 3-6, 4-6, 6-4, 2-6

 Leonardo Lavalle
 First round — Defeated Jan Siemerink (Netherlands) 6-4, 6-4, 6-2
 Second round — Defeated Henri Leconte (France) 6-4, 3-6, 4-6, 6-3, 10-8
 Third round — Defeated Carl-Uwe Steeb (Germany) 6-4, 3-6, 6-3, 6-2
 Quarterfinals — Lost to Jordi Arrese (Spain) 1-6, 6-7, 1-6

Men's Doubles Competition
 Leonardo Lavalle and Francisco Maciel
 First round — Lost to Owen Casey and Eoin Collins (Ireland) 6-7, 4-6, retired

Women's Singles Competition
Lupita Novelo
 First Round — Lost to Steffi Graf (Germany) 1-6 1-6

Wrestling

See also
Mexico at the 1991 Pan American Games

References

Nations at the 1992 Summer Olympics
1992
Olympics